The Only Place is an album by Scorn, released in 2021 by Ohm Resistance. Mick Harris commented "The album was made with the only place in mind where I can let go of all the hatred, anger, and darkness that are what fuel Scorn".

The track "Distortion" is a collaboration of Mick Harris with Kool Keith and Submerged. It was released as an EP with four mixes and a fifth, longer mix was brought out on the album. Regarding Kool Keith's lyrics, Harris commented "I knew that he’d nail something, and it’s as simple as that". In June 2021, the album was released and Harris shared the track "At One Point" exclusively via The Wire.

Critical response 
The album received positive responses from critics. The Sleeping Shaman review said "The Only Place is an album to get lost in, to focus a mood on, rather than put on for sheer instant gratification". Igloo Magazine admired the "mangled, rugged and exploratory sonic displays". The Quietus commented "The Only Place demonstrates anew that there is such a thing as a signature Scorn sound – primarily instrumental, driven by dub's celebration of bass, beats and space, at once weirdly comforting and with a strange, forbidding edge".

Track listing

References

External links 
 

2021 albums
Scorn (band) albums
Albums produced by Mick Harris